Mount Mizugaki (瑞牆山 Mizugaki-san) is a mountain located in Hokuto-city, in the Yamanashi Prefecture, within Chichibu-Tama-Kai National Park. It is one of the 100 Famous Japanese Mountains. It is part of the Okuchichibu Mountains. It has an altitude of 2230m. The mountain is located just across from Mt. Kinpu/Kinpō.

The mountain is composed mainly of granite, and has beautiful flowers in summer. Mt. Mizugaki has a unique shape consisting of a number of granite rocks, strangely shaped rocks and huge rocks that is opposite to Chichibu mountains covered with rich woods. The view from the peak is magnificent and hiking routes are in good condition. Many hikers walk here especially in the seasons of fresh green and autumn leaves.

Hiking 
From Mizugaki sanso (roundtrip): 5 hours 35 minutes (5.8 km)

Rock Climbing 
It is a holy spot for Rock Climbers both boulders and rope climbers.

Hut 
 Mizugaki Sanso(瑞牆山荘)
 Fujimidaira Goya(富士見平小屋)

References 

Mountains of Yamagata Prefecture
National parks of Japan
Parks and gardens in Yamanashi Prefecture